Swale (April 21, 1981 – June 17, 1984) was an American thoroughbred racehorse. He is best known for winning the Kentucky Derby and the Belmont Stakes in 1984. He died eight days after his win in the latter race.

Background
A son of the 1977 Triple Crown winner Seattle Slew, Swale was trained by Woody Stephens and ridden by Laffit Pincay, Jr., both now members of the National Museum of Racing and Hall of Fame.  Swale's dam, the stakes winning mare Tuerta, was born with one eye.  Her name means "one-eyed" in Spanish.

Racing career

1983: two-year-old season
At 2, Swale broke his maiden at Belmont Park on July 21, 1983.  Next out, he was entered in the Saratoga Special Stakes, and in the muddy going at Saratoga Race Course, won the race with jockey Eddie Maple.  After finishing third in the Hopeful Stakes at Saratoga, Swale went undefeated the remainder of his two-year-old campaign, with wins in the Belmont Futurity Stakes, Breeders' Futurity Stakes, and Young America Stakes.

1984: three-year-old season
At 3, Swale won the Hutcheson Stakes at Gulfstream Park by seven lengths first out.  After displacing his palate in the Fountain of Youth Stakes, where he finished third, he won the Florida Derby with new rider Laffit Pincay, Jr., running the mile and one-eighth in 1:47 3/5 as he drew away from favored Dr. Carter at the end.  After being upset in the sloppy going at Keeneland Race Course in the Lexington Stakes when second, Swale won the Kentucky Derby at historic Churchill Downs.

The day before departing for Baltimore for the Preakness Stakes, Swale worked seven furlongs in 1:24, galloping out the mile in 1:37 1/5 at Churchill Downs, then shipped to Baltimore on Monday and worked a half-mile in a swift :46, galloping out five furlongs in :59 3/5 two days before the big race. That Saturday he ran an uncharacteristic seventh in the Preakness Stakes.  Swale came back to win the longest and most gruelling of the U.S. Triple Crown races, the Belmont Stakes.

Death
On June 17, 1984, eight days after the Belmont Stakes, Swale collapsed and died en route to his stall following a bath. He was buried at Claiborne Farm.

Honors and awards
Swale posthumously received the Eclipse Award for Outstanding Three-Year-Old Male Horse for 1984. He earned $1,583,660 during his two-year racing career.

The Swale Stakes, an annual  Grade II stakes race for three-year-olds at Gulfstream Park in Hallandale, Florida, was named in his honor.

Pedigree

See also
 List of historical horses

References

1981 racehorse births
1984 racehorse deaths
Racehorses bred in Kentucky
Racehorses trained in the United States
Kentucky Derby winners
Belmont Stakes winners
Eclipse Award winners
Hancock family
Thoroughbred family 1-n